Mathili is a town and an administrative block headquarters of Malkangiri district, Odisha, India.

The Sports festival of the Annual, 'Malyabanta Mahotsav'-2009, the cultural festival of Malkangiri district, will start from Mathili on 19 October

Geography
It has an average elevation of 170 metres (558 feet).

History
Mathili came into National News when Laxman Nayak  or Laxman Naik (22 November 1899 – 29 March 1943), the greatest freedom fighter ever this place had led the tribals for a non-cooperation movement against the British. He was a follower of non-violence principle of Mahatma Gandhi. In 1942, he led a demonstration in Mathili on 21 August police opened fire at the peaceful mob killing and demonstrators namely Nakula Pujari, Samara Nayak, Narasingha Bhumia and Linga Kotia. In this incident, a forest guard namely G.Ramaya was killed for which Laxman Naik was accused of and arrested. The trial continued for four months and on 13 November 1942 the then Sessions Judge V.Ramanathan put forward his verdict, " Accused No.1 Sri Laxman Naik is convicted under section 302 I.P.C. and sentenced to death subject to confirmation by the Hon'ble High Court ".

References

External links
 History Malkangiri district website.
 Village Panchayats under Mathili National Panchayat Directory.
 Mathili at wikimapia
 Map of Malkangiri district

Cities and towns in Malkangiri district